The Advanced Technology & Education Park (ATEP) is a part of the California Community Colleges system. It is a satellite campus for both Irvine Valley College and Saddleback College, serving the South Orange County Community College District. Opened in 2007, the campus offers programs in design model making/rapid protyping, laser photonics, network security and foreign languages.

Programs
ATEP's Center for Applied Competitive Technologies (CACT) is designated a National Center for Photonics Education, a National Science Foundation Center of Excellence.

Campus and surroundings
It is situated south of Interstate 5 at the corner of Red Hill and Valencia. Located  from the California coast, the campus enjoys a mild, Mediterranean coastal climate, with comfortable temperatures year-round and very little rainfall.

College statistics
The school is on a calendar semester system, with fall semester, spring semester, and summer sessions.

Affiliations
The school is a National Center for Photonics Education, a National Science Foundation Center of Excellence.

References

External links
Irvine Valley College
Saddleback College
South Orange County Community College District

Tustin, California
California Community Colleges
Educational institutions established in 2007
Universities and colleges in Orange County, California
2007 establishments in California